Lepidium latipes is a species of flowering plant in the mustard family known by the common name San Diego  pepperweed. It is native to California and Baja California, where it grows in alkaline soils in a number of habitat types.

Description
Leaves are linear in shape and several centimeters (inches) long.

The plant produces a dense inflorescence of many tiny, hairy flowers with green petals, their sepals packed between them.

External links
Jepson Manual Treatment of Lepidium latipes
Lepidium latipes  var. latipes — U.C. Photo gallery

latipes
Flora of Baja California
Flora of California
Natural history of the California chaparral and woodlands
Natural history of the California Coast Ranges
Natural history of the Central Valley (California)
Natural history of the Peninsular Ranges
Natural history of the San Francisco Bay Area
Natural history of the Transverse Ranges
Plants described in 1836
Flora without expected TNC conservation status